Sean Sullivan (born 28 December 1970) is an Irish judoka. He competed in the men's extra-lightweight event at the 1996 Summer Olympics.

References

External links
 

1970 births
Living people
Irish male judoka
Olympic judoka of Ireland
Judoka at the 1996 Summer Olympics
Place of birth missing (living people)
20th-century Irish people